The 7th Light Mechanised Brigade Combat Team is a formation in the British Army with a direct lineage to 7th Armoured Brigade and a history that stretches back to the Napoleonic Wars. It saw active service in the Crimean War, the Second Boer War and both the First and the Second World Wars. In 2014, the 7th Armoured Brigade was re-designated as 7th Infantry Brigade, thereby ensuring that the famed "Desert Rats" continue in the British Army's Order of battle.

History

Waterloo Campaign
When Wellington organized his troops into numbered divisions for the Peninsular War, the component brigades were named for the commanding officer. For the Hundred Days Campaign, he numbered his British infantry brigades in a single sequence, 1st to 10th. The 7th Brigade formed part of the 7th Division under the command of Major-general Kenneth MacKenzie. It consisted of:
 2nd Battalion, 25th (the King's Own Borderers) Regiment of Foot
 2nd Battalion, 37th (the North Hampshire) Regiment of Foot
 2nd Battalion, 78th (Highlanders) Regiment of Foot (or The Ross-shire Buffs)
It was assigned to garrison duty and so played no part in the Battle of Waterloo.

Crimean War
The 7th Brigade formed part of the 4th Division in the Crimean War. At the Battle of the Alma it was commanded by Brigadier-General Arthur Wellesley Torrens and consisted of:
 20th (the East Devonshire) Regiment of Foot
 21st Regiment of Foot (Royal North British Fusiliers)
 68th (Durham) Regiment of Foot (Light Infantry)
The brigade was present with the 4th Division at the Battle of Balaclava and played a more major role at the Battle of Inkerman.

Second Boer War
After the Relief of Ladysmith, part of the garrison of Ladysmith were reorganized into the 7th Brigade on 10 March 1900. It consisted of
 1st Battalion, Devonshire Regiment
 1st Battalion, Manchester Regiment
 2nd Battalion, Gordon Highlanders
 2nd Battalion, Rifle Brigade (Prince Consort's Own)
Initially commanded by Colonel W.G. Knox , it was taken over by Brigadier-General Walter Kitchener on 26 March. The brigade formed part of Lyttelton's 4th Division and took part in Sir Redvers Buller's advance north. In August 1900, it took part in the Battle of Bergendal, the last set-piece battle of the war.

Post-war, the brigade was reformed in January 1906 as part of the 4th Division, before joining the 3rd Division in Southern Command in 1907.

First World War
At the outbreak of the First World War in August 1914, the 7th Brigade was a regular army formation stationed at Tidworth and assigned to the 3rd Division. It mobilized with the division, crossed to France between 11 and 16 August, concentrated around Aulnoye and Avesnes, and moved forward on 21 August 1914. Other than a brief period when it was reorganized in England in 1918, the brigade served with the 3rd and 25th Divisions on the Western Front throughout the war.

3rd Division
With the 3rd Division, the brigade took part in a large number of actions in 1914: the Battle of Mons (23 and 24 August) and subsequent retreat (24 August – 5 September) including the action of Solesmes and the Battle of Le Cateau. It then took part in the First Battle of the Marne (6 – 9 September) and the Race to the Sea: First Battle of the Aisne (13 – 20 September), and the battles of La Bassée (10 October – 2 November), Messines (31 October – 2 November), Armentières (1 and 2 November) culminating in the First Battle of Ypres (5 – 21 November), notably the Battle of Nonne Bosschen (11 November). 1915 was relatively quieter, but included the First Attack on Bellewaarde (16 June), Hooge (19 July) and the Second Attack on Bellewaarde (25 September).

While with the 3rd Division, the brigade commanded
 3rd Battalion, Worcestershire Regiment
 2nd Battalion, South Lancashire Regiment
 1st Battalion, Wiltshire Regiment
 2nd Battalion, Royal Irish Rifles
 1/1st Battalion, Honourable Artillery Company (T.F.) – joined from 8th Infantry Brigade on 9 December 1914; left for GHQ Troops on 14 October 1915
 1/4th Battalion, South Lancashire Regiment (T.F.) – joined on 24 February 1915 and became divisional pioneer battalion on 12 October 1915

25th Division
On 18 October 1915, 7th Brigade was posted to the 25th Division in exchange for 76th Brigade as part of a policy of "stiffening" New Army Divisions with regular units. Once there, it was extensively reorganized on 26 October:
 2nd Battalion, Royal Irish Rifles transferred to 74th Brigade in exchange for 10th (Service) Battalion, Cheshire Regiment
 2nd Battalion, South Lancashire Regiment transferred to 75th Brigade in exchange for 8th (Service) Battalion, Loyal Regiment (North Lancashire)
On 12 January 1916, the brigade formed the 7th Machine Gun Company and was joined by the 7th Trench Mortar Battery on 18 June 1916.

The brigade saw action in 1916 defending against the German attack on the Vimy Ridge (21 May) but particularly in the Battle of the Somme, including the battles of Albert (3 – 13 July), Bazentin Ridge (14 – 16 July), Pozières Ridge (18 August – 3 September including the fighting for Mouquet Farm on 3 September) and Ancre Heights (1 – 22 October including the capture of the Stuff Redoubt and the Regina Trench). In 1917 it saw action at the Battle of Messines (7 – 14 June) and the Third Battle of Ypres (31 July – 10 August). On 13 October 1917, 4th (Extra Reserve) Battalion, South Staffordshire Regiment joined the brigade and on 10 November the 3rd Battalion, Worcestershire Regiment transferred to 74th Brigade.

On 1 March, the 7th Machine Gun Company joined the 74th, 75th and (divisional) 195th Machine Gun Companies in the 25th Battalion, Machine Gun Corps. Due to a shortage of manpower, all British divisions on the Western Front were reduced from a 12-battalion to a 9-battalion basis in February 1918. As a consequence, 7th Brigade was reduced from four to three battalions. Almost immediately, the German Army's Spring Offensive fell upon the division. The 25th Division was remarkably unlucky; having faced the first German onslaught at the First Battles of the Somme (21 – 25 March), it was moved north to refit, where it faced the second offensive in the Battles of the Lys (9 – 29 April). It was once again moved south to a quite part of the line where it was attacked for the third time in the Battle of the Aisne (27 May – 6 June).

Due to losses sustained, the division was withdrawn from the line and the brigades were reduced to cadre. The divisional and brigade HQs returned to England with 10th Cheshires and 10 other Training Cadre (T.C.) battalions, arriving on 30 June. For the 7th Brigade this meant:
 10th (Service) Battalion, Cheshire Regiment was reduced to Training Cadre on 21 June and went to England with the brigade
 4th (E.R.) Battalion, South Staffordshire Regiment joined No. 1 Battalion, Composite Brigade on 21 June and transferred with it to 50th (Northumbrian) Division the next day
 1st Battalion, Wiltshire Regiment transferred to 110th Brigade, 21st Division on 20 June
 7th Trench Mortar Battery was broken up on 18 June and the personnel helped to form a Light T.M. Battery for the Composite Brigade
 8th (Service) Battalion, Leicestershire Regiment joined as a T.C. from 110th Brigade, 21st Division at Boulogne on 30 June and went to England with the brigade
 13th (Service) Battalion, East Surrey Regiment joined as a T.C. from 119th Brigade, 40th Division at Boulogne on 30 June and went to England with the brigade
The brigade arrived in England on 30 June and went to Mytchett Camp, Aldershot. Soon after, the T.C. battalions left the brigade (10th Cheshires and 8th Leicesters on 7 July, 13th East Surreys on 16 July) for Eastern Command where they were reformed.

The brigade HQ returned to France with 25th Division HQ on 15 September, arriving at Saint-Riquier near Abbeville the next day. Units left behind in France (artillery, engineers, signals, pioneers, machine gunners, etc.) rejoined the division between then and 19 October. The brigade was reformed on 16 September with battalions withdrawn from the Italian Front:
 9th (Service) Battalion, Devonshire Regiment from 20th Brigade, 7th Division
 20th (Service) Battalion, Manchester Regiment from 22nd Brigade, 7th Division
 21st (Service) Battalion, Manchester Regiment from 91st Brigade, 7th Division
 7th Trench Mortar Battery began reforming on 13 October
Thereafter the brigade took part in the Final Advance to Victory, notably in the Battles of the Hindenburg Line – Battle of the Beaurevoir Line (4 and 5 October), Battle of Cambrai (8 and 9 October), and Pursuit to the Selle (9 – 11 October) – and the Final Advance in Picardy – Battle of the Selle (17 – 25 October) and Battle of the Sambre (4 November).

Second World War
The brigade continued in existence throughout the interwar period, seeing numerous changes in its composition and eventually, in the late 1930s, leading to it being redesignated 7th Infantry Brigade (Guards). At the outbreak of the Second World War in September 1939, the 7th Infantry Brigade (Guards) was, once again, assigned to the 3rd Infantry Division, commanded at the time by Major-General Bernard Montgomery, in Southern Command. It was stationed at Pirbright Camp with the following units under command:

 1st Battalion, Grenadier Guards
 2nd Battalion, Grenadier Guards
 1st Battalion, Coldstream Guards (at Chelsea Barracks, London)
 7th Infantry Brigade (Guards) Anti-Tank Company

The brigade, commanded by Brigadier John Whitaker, moved to France with the rest of the 3rd Division on 30 September 1939 as part of the British Expeditionary Force (BEF) and remained there, serving alongside the French Army, until May 1940. It first saw action against the German Army's offensive in Belgium and France, notably on the Ypres-Comines Canal (26 – 28 May 1940) before being evacuated from Dunkirk to the United Kingdom by 1 June. On 15 September 1941, it was converted to the Guards Support Group.

The 37th Infantry Brigade (originally in 12th (Eastern) Infantry Division) joined the 3rd Infantry Division on 27 November 1941 and on 8 December it was redesignated as 7th Infantry Brigade. At this time it commanded:

 2nd Battalion, South Wales Borderers
 2/6th Battalion, East Surrey Regiment
 6th Battalion, Royal Sussex Regiment

The brigade served with the 9th Armoured Division from June 1942 until July 1944, when the division was disbanded, followed by the 47th Infantry (Reserve) Division from 10 September 1944 until August 1945. On 30 September 1944, it was reorganised as a reserve brigade whereupon it was redesignated as the 7th Infantry (Reserve) Brigade. The brigade remained in the United Kingdom throughout. By the end of the war, the brigade structure was:

 13th Battalion, Queen's Royal Regiment (West Surrey)
 12th Battalion, Royal Fusiliers
 2/6th Battalion, East Surrey Regiment
 2/4th Battalion, Essex Regiment

Structure

On 5 March 2013, the British Secretary of State for Defence, Philip Hammond, announced that the 7th Armoured Brigade would have its Challenger 2 tanks and heavy armoured battalions removed over the next decade. The Brigade itself will be re-designated as the 7th Infantry Brigade and Headquarters East, but retain its famed 'Desert Rats' insignia. On 24 February 2015, the brigade formally stepped out of its armour role into that of an infantry brigade and regional point of command. At the same time, 49th (East) Brigade merged into 7th Infantry Brigade.

7th Infantry Brigade 
Units commanded by the brigade, which is based in Cottesmore, include:
1st Queen's Dragoon Guards, in Swanton Morley with Jackal reconnaissance vehicles
 Royal Yeomanry, in London with Jackal reconnaissance vehicles (Army Reserve – paired with 1st Queen's Dragoon Guards)
 1st Battalion, Royal Anglian Regiment, at Woolwich Barracks, Woolwich
 2nd Battalion, Royal Anglian Regiment, at Kendrew Barracks, Cottesmore
 1st Battalion, The Rifles, at Beachley Barracks, Chepstow (In 2027 the battalion will move to MoD St Athan)
 1st Battalion, Yorkshire Regiment, at Alma Lines, Catterick Garrison
 4th Battalion The Princess of Wales's Royal Regiment, in Redhill (Army Reserve – paired with 1st Battalion, Royal Anglian Regiment)
 3rd Battalion, Royal Anglian Regiment, in Bury St Edmunds (Army Reserve – paired with 2nd Battalion, Royal Anglian Regiment)
 6th Battalion, The Rifles, at Wyvern Barracks, Exeter (Army Reserve – paired with 1st Battalion, The Rifles) 
 32 Engineer Regiment, Royal Engineers, at Marne Barracks, Catterick Garrison
 6 Regiment, Royal Logistic Corps, at Dishforth Airfield, North Yorkshire
 1 Close Support Battalion, Royal Electrical and Mechanical Engineers, at Meggido Lines, Catterick Garrison

Headquarters East  
In 2015, 7th Armoured Brigade merged with 49th (East) Brigade, the later of which became 'Headquarters East', which is the point of contact for the 12 counties of the East Midlands and the East of England; Lincolnshire, South Yorkshire, Nottinghamshire, Leicestershire, Rutland, Northamptonshire, Bedfordshire, Hertfordshire, Essex, Suffolk, Norfolk, and Cambridgeshire.  The following comes under the headquarters for administrative purposes:

 Headquarters East, Chetwynd Barracks, Chilwell
 Cambridge University Officers' Training Corps (Army Reserve), in Cambridge
 East Midlands University Officers' Training Corps (Army Reserve), in Nottingham
 7th Infantry Brigade & Headquarters East Cadet Training Team, at Kendrew Barracks, Cottesmore
 Bedfordshire and Hertfordshire Army Cadet Force, in Hertford
 Cambridgeshire Army Cadet Force, in Waterbeach
 Essex Army Cadet Force, in Chelmsford
 Leicestershire, Northamptonshire, and Rutland Army Cadet Force, in South Wigston
 Lincolnshire Army Cadet Force, at Sobraon Barracks, Lincoln
 Norfolk Army Cadet Force, in Dereham
 Northamptonshire Army Cadet Force, in Northampton
 Suffolk Army Cadet Force, in Ipswich

7th Infantry Brigade was also regionally aligned with the western African region as part of defence engagement.

Under the Future Soldier programme, the brigade was redesignated as the 7th Light Mechanised Brigade Combat Team.

Commanding officers

The 7th Brigade had the following commanders from January 1906:

Since being reformed from 7th Armoured Brigade in November 2014 commanders have been:

See also
 British Expeditionary Force (World War I)
 British Expeditionary Force (World War II)
 7th Armoured Brigade
 7th Armoured Division

Notes

References

Bibliography

External links
 Official website
 
 
 
 
 

Infantry brigades of the British Army
Infantry brigades of the British Army in World War I
7 Infantry
Military units and formations established in 1815
Military units and formations disestablished in 1945
Military units and formations established in 2014